BJ Casey (Betty Jo) is an American psychologist and expert on adolescent brain development and self control. She is a professor of Psychology and Affiliated Professor of the Justice Collaboratory and Interdepartmental Neuroscience Program at Yale University where she directs the Fundamentals of the Adolescent Brain (FAB) Lab.

Casey has served on the editorial boards for the journals Developmental Science (2002–2013), Journal of Cognitive Neuroscience (2005–2010), Journal of the American Academy of Child and Adolescent Psychiatry (2008), and Biology of Mood and Anxiety Disorders (2014–2016). Casey has served on several national advisory boards, and has won a number of honors and awards. Her scientific discoveries have been featured in numerous media outlets such as National Geographic, Time, and NPR.

Biography 
Casey was born in Kinston, North Carolina and grew up on a family farm. She was the first in her family to obtain an advanced degree, earning her bachelor's and master's degrees in psychology from Appalachian State University and her doctorate in experimental psychology and behavioral neuroscience from the University of South Carolina. During her postdoctoral fellowship at the National Institute of Mental Health, Casey learned about functional magnetic resonance imaging (fMRI) which offered a glimpse into the human brain. She was among the first scientists to use fMRI in children, laying the groundwork for a new field of study: developmental cognitive neuroscience.

Following her postdoc, she was an assistant professor at the University of Pittsburgh Medical Center and a Visiting Research Collaborator at Princeton University. She was then recruited by Michael Posner to direct the Sackler Institute for Developmental Psychobiology. During this time, she also held the position of associate professor of Psychiatry and Professor of Psychology in Psychiatry and Neuroscience at Weill Cornell Medicine. Casey served as the Director of the Neuroscience program at Weill Cornell for five years. In 2016, Casey moved to Yale University where she now directs the Fundamentals of the Adolescent Brain (FAB) lab.

Casey has served on several national advisory boards including the National Institute of Mental Health (NIMH) Board of Scientific Counselors and NIMH Council, the Scientific Advisory Board for the National Alliance for Research on Schizophrenia & Depression (NARSAD), Advisory Board for the Human Connectome Project - Life Span Study, the National Research Council Board on Children, Youth and Families, and National Research Council and Institute of Medicine committees of the National Academies on the Science of Adolescent Risk Taking, Assessing Juvenile Justice Reform, and Sports Related Concussions in Youth.

Research 
Casey is one of the most cited scientists in developmental neuroscience, with over 200 publications and over 50,000 citations.

Over the course of her career, her work has spanned a range of topics across human development from visual attention in infants, to adolescent development, and the subsequent transition into early adulthood. In addition to using fMRI to examine typical and atypical brain and behavioral development, Casey has studied both humans and genetically altered mice in her research. Her work has demonstrated similar patterns of behavior and brain activity during adolescence across species. Casey proposed a prominent model of adolescent neurobiology known as the imbalance model, a foundational theory for many developmental neuroscience studies in humans and in animals. This model posits that dynamic changes in brain structure and function during adolescence lead to transient imbalances in how brain areas communicate that impact emotion reactivity and regulation during adolescence, relative to earlier and later developmental stages. In collaboration with the late Walter Mischel, Casey studied the original participants of Mischel's famous 1972 Stanford Bing Nursery School "Marshmallow Experiment" 40 years later. The study's findings suggested that individual differences in self-control seen in early childhood may be predictive of motivational processing and cognitive control in adulthood.

During Casey's 15-year tenure as the director of the Sackler Institute for Developmental Psychobiology, she cultivated the institute's world-renowned reputation, bringing in numerous training and center grants from the National Institutes of Health, National Science Foundation, the John Merck Fund, the Dana Foundation, and the MacArthur Foundation. Among these are two approximately $10 million grants from the National Institutes of Health. From 2008 to 2013, one of these awards funded the Center for Brain, Gene, and Behavioral (CBGB) Research Across Development, which aimed to examine how brain-derived neurotrophic factor (BDNF) influenced learning and responses to stress across development. In 2015, the National Institutes of Health funded the Adolescent Brain Cognitive Development (ABCD) Study®, the largest long-term study of child and adolescent health and brain development in the United States. Casey was awarded a grant of over $10 million as Principal Investigator of the ABCD Study Yale University site.

Mentoring and training 
Casey directed the John Merck Fund Summer Institute on the Biology of Developmental Disabilities from 2001 to 2010 and then the Mortimer D. Sackler, M.D. Summer Institute on Translational Developmental Neuroscience from 2012 to 2016, both specialized training courses in developmental science for graduate students, postdocs, and early career faculty.

Casey has formally mentored over 30 pre and post doctoral trainees. Her trainees include Adriana Galván and Catherine Hartley.

Public Engagement 
Casey is a member of the MacArthur Foundation Research Network on Law and Neuroscience and is frequently called upon as an expert in adolescent development in both the scientific and legal arenas. Her research was included in amicus briefs presented to the U.S. Supreme Court to argue against the death penalty in juveniles (Roper v. Simmons, 2005) and mandatory life without parole (Graham v. Florida, 2010; Miller v. Alabama, 2012).

Honors
Casey has been awarded an honorary doctorate from Utrecht University, 2015 Ruane Prize for Outstanding Achievement in Child and Adolescent Psychiatric Research, 2016 Irish America Magazine's Healthcare and Life Sciences 50, 2017 Social & Affective Neuroscience Society Distinguished Scholar Award, and the 2019 Flux: The Society for Dev Cognitive Neuroscience Huttenlocher Award.

Selected publications 
Casey, B. J., Castellanos, F. X., Giedd, J. N., Marsh, W. L., Hamburger, S. D., Schubert, A. B., ... & Rapoport, J. L. (1997). Implication of right frontostriatal circuitry in response inhibition and attention-deficit/hyperactivity disorder. Journal of the American Academy of Child & Adolescent Psychiatry, 36(3), 374–383.
Casey, B. J., Getz, S., & Galvan, A. (2008). The adolescent brain. Developmental Review, 28(1), 62–77.
Casey, B. J., Giedd, J. N., & Thomas, K. M. (2000). Structural and functional brain development and its relation to cognitive development. Biological Psychology, 54(1-3), 241–257.
Casey, B. J., Somerville, L. H., Gotlib, I. H., Ayduk, O., Franklin, N. T., Askren, M. K., ... & Shoda, Y. (2011). Behavioral and neural correlates of delay of gratification 40 years later. Proceedings of the National Academy of Sciences, 108(36), 14998–15003.
Casey, B. J., Tottenham, N., Liston, C., & Durston, S. (2005). Imaging the developing brain: what have we learned about cognitive development? Trends in Cognitive Sciences, 9(3), 104–110.
Casey, B. J., Trainor, R. J., Orendi, J. L., Schubert, A. B., Nystrom, L. E., Giedd, J. N., ... & Rapoport, J. L. (1997). A developmental functional MRI study of prefrontal activation during performance of a go-no-go task. Journal of Cognitive Neuroscience, 9(6), 835–847.

References

External links 
 Research | FABLAB | Yale University
 BJ Casey | Department of Psychology
BJ Casey publications indexed by Google Scholar

Yale University faculty
Living people
American women psychologists
21st-century American psychologists
American neuroscientists
Appalachian State University alumni
University of South Carolina alumni
Adolescence
Year of birth missing (living people)
American women academics
21st-century American women scientists